Isabel H. Benham (August 4, 1909 – May 18, 2013) was an American railroad finance expert. She was the first female partner at any Wall Street bond house. She was a graduate of Bryn Mawr College.

References

1909 births
2013 deaths
American businesspeople
American centenarians
Bryn Mawr College alumni
Place of birth missing
Place of death missing
Women centenarians